Charity Taylor (16 September 1914 – 4 January 1998) was a medical doctor and prison administrator. In 1945, she was appointed the first woman Governor of Holloway Prison. Taylor was the first woman prison governor in the United Kingdom.

Taylor was born May Doris Charity Clifford in 1914 in Woking and studied medicine at the Royal Free Hospital. She was appointed assistant medical officer at Holloway in 1942, later becoming medical officer, before becoming governor in 1945. In 1955 she was governor during the imprisonment and hanging of Ruth Ellis.

Personal life
She married the physician/politician Stephen Taylor, Baron Taylor of Harlow, Labour/SDP life peer in 1939.

References

1914 births
1998 deaths
British baronesses
British prison governors
Spouses of life peers
20th-century English medical doctors